Standin' on the Never Never was the first release by Danish rock band D-A-D, then known as Disneyland After Dark. The EP was released on 28 May 1985 on Mega Records.
Mega was satisfied with the result and continued the collaboration, which resulted in Call of the Wild, the first full-length album by D-A-D.

Track listing

Personnel
Adapted from the EP's liner notes.
Disneyland After Dark 
 Jesper Binzer – vocals, guitar, backing vocals
 Stig Pedersen – vocals, bass, backing vocals
 Jacob Binzer – guitar, keyboards, backing vocals
 Peter Lundholm – drums
Technical
 Frank Marstokk – producer
 Jørgen Bo – engineer
 Jönsson Design – cover art
 Robin Skjoldborg – photography

References

External links
 This EP on D-A-D's official homepage

1985 debut albums
D.A.D. (band) albums